Adrián Américo González (born 6 July 1995) is an Argentine professional footballer who plays as a centre-back for Crucero del Norte.

Career
González made his bow into senior football with Nueva Chicago. After featuring in a 6–4 victory over Villa Dálmine on 29 April 2016 and a defeat to Juventud Unida Universitario in May, González scored his first goal in his third appearance against Central Córdoba on 1 June 2016. He made a total of six appearances in the 2016 Primera B Nacional, which was followed by a further thirty-seven across his next two seasons. González was released in June 2020.

Career statistics
.

References

External links

1995 births
Living people
Sportspeople from Buenos Aires Province
Argentine footballers
Association football defenders
Primera Nacional players
Nueva Chicago footballers
Huracán de Comodoro Rivadavia footballers
Club Comunicaciones footballers
Crucero del Norte footballers